Eileen Qutub is a former state legislator in Oregon. She served in the Oregon House of Representatives and Oregon Senate. She now lives in Washington State. She is a Republican. She served in Oregon's legislature from January 1995 until January 2001 representing Washington County, Oregon.

In 2000 she spoke at an Oregon Republican candidates rally aired on C-SPAN.

She opposed Oregon's Death with Dignity Act.

References

Year of birth missing (living people)
Living people
People from Washington County, Oregon
Republican Party Oregon state senators
Republican Party members of the Oregon House of Representatives
Women state legislators in Oregon
21st-century American politicians
21st-century American women politicians
20th-century American politicians
20th-century American women politicians
Place of birth missing (living people)